Barry Vivian (born 10 May 1950) is a New Zealand professional golfer. He won the inaugural Australian Masters in 1979 and represented New Zealand in the World Cup three times. He played on the European Senior Tour for a few years where he was twice runner-up.

Early life 
Vivian was born in the Hawke's Bay Region of New Zealand. He grew up in the city of Hastings. Vivian turned pro in 1966. He did his apprenticeship at Hastings Golf Club. Overall, Vivian worked at the club for eight years.

Professional career 
In 1974, Vivian quit work at Hastings. He decided to work as a touring professional. In the middle of the year, he played some events on the European Tour. In November, Vivian first received serious media attention for his performance at the City of Auckland Classic. He shot an opening round 68 (−3) to find himself in joint third with, among others, Hubert Green.

In August 1976, he played the Fiji Open at Fiji Golf Club. He opened with a course record 67 (−5) to take the lead. He shot a second round 71 to maintain the lead. In the third round, he shot a 74 but in the "wet conditions" he still held the lead, now one over Walter Godfrey. He would go on to win the event. In November, he seriously competed for the New Zealand Airlines Classic held at Russley Golf Club. He was at 206 (−13) entering the final round, two back of leader Bob Shearer. However he was outplayed by several shots on Sunday and did not seriously contend. In 1976 he also won an event in Western Samoa. He earned A$4,000 for the win. It was the highest check he earned in his career up to this point.

Vivian's good play qualified him for New Zealand's 1976 World Cup. The event was held in December in Palm Springs, California. His teammate was Simon Owen. Owen and Vivian arrived late and were not able to practice much at a golf course they not familiar with. Vivian fired an opening round 74 (+2) and, with Owen's 71, were at 145 (+1), in a tie for fourth with Australia. In the third round, Vivian shot a 75 (+3) and the team was at 442 (+10), in a tie for seventh, 11 back of the United States. In the final round, he shot a 74 (+2) and the team finished in ninth at 590 (+14). Individually, Vivian finished in a tie for 34th among 96 players.

In April 1977, Vivian seriously competed at the Western Australia PGA Championship. In a "tense finish" he had a chance to tie clubhouse leader Kel Nagle at the last hole. He was unable to birdie to the par-5 18th, however. At 284 (−4), he finished one back of champion Nagle in solo second. In August, he won the Pacific Harbour Open in Suva, Fiji defeating compatriot Terry Kendall and Australia's George Serhan in a playoff.

Vivian did not receive much media attention during the first half of 1978. Around the middle of the year, he considered giving up the career of a touring professional. However, he continued to play. In late 1978 he had some minor successes as a touring professional. He successfully repeated as Pacific Harbour Open champion in August. In October he opened with a 70 (−1) at the South Coast Open to position himself two off of the lead in a tie for fourth. He shot even-par the next day and remained two back.

In March 1979, he played excellently at the Australian Masters. His tournament began with an "inconspicuous start," however, as he bogeyed the first hole. However, he birdied five of the next six holes. Early on the back nine he made three more birdies. Vivian experienced a "jolt" on the par-4 17th, three-putting for double bogey. However, he made a "curling" 15-metre putt on the final hole for his ninth birdie of the day. Overall, his 67 (−6) was a course record and gave him a two stroke lead. He stated it was his best round ever in a tournament in Australia. In the second round, he again opened shakily but eventually settled down, making the turn at even-par for the day. He then played "faultlessly" on the back nine with four birdies for a 69 (−4). He had a three-stroke lead over Bob Shearer. In the third round, Vivian shot, in his words, a "pretty hectic" even-par 73. It was enough to maintain a three shot lead over Shearer. Like previous rounds, Vivian did not open well, three-putting for bogey on the first hole. He ultimately shot a 40 (+3) on the front nine. His "horrific" day continued with bogeys on the 10th and 11th. There were severe winds, however, and few of Vivian's competitors were able to take advantage. His nearest competitor, Bob Shearer, made seven bogeys during the final round and ultimately shot a 78 (+5). Starting at the 12th hole Vivian was able to settle down and make four consecutive pars. Vivian entered the final hole with a two stoke lead. His "concentration was upset" before his second shot by a helicopter; he hit his approach on the par-5 18th into a greenside bunker. His third shot from the bunker was a "flyer" into the crowd. Vivian then chipped on and two-putted for bogey. He won by one. "What a way to win," he said immediately after the event. It was his first "major" win after a number of minor victories in the Pacific islands. After the event he stated, "I know my capabilities and I know I have been very fortunate this week." Vivian defeated a number of star golfers including past and future major champions Kel Nagle, Greg Norman, and Lee Trevino.

In late 1979, Vivian qualified for New Zealand's World Cup team again. He was paired with Craig Owen, the brother of Simon Owen. Vivian shot an opening round 73 at Glyfada Golf Club in Athens, Greece. He played worse in the second round, shooting a 76 (+6). His playing partner Owen, however, played better with a 70. They had a 311 total after the first two days. Ultimately, the New Zealand pair finished 15th among 45 teams.

In 1980, Vivian would have some success. In March, he seriously contended at the Royal Fremantle Open. In the first round, he shot a 74 (+2) to place himself in joint second place, two behind leader Ray Hore. The following day, he shot a 70 (−2), the round of the tournament, to tie Hore for the lead. Vivian shot a third round 71 (−1) to maintain the joint lead, this time with Chris Tickner. However, he "blew up" with a final round 77 (+5) to finish solo fourth, five behind champion Tickner. The following month, he finished in second place at the Legacy-CIG pro-am, one behind Ian Stanley. In November, he placed high at the New South Wales Open. He shot a final round 68 (−3), the round of the day, to move himself in a tie for third, one behind runner-up Sam Torrance. By virtue of these performances he was able to represent New Zealand at the 1980 World Cup in Bogota, Colombia. Paired with Craig Owen again, the team did not have a distinguished effort, finishing 25th among the 42 teams that finished.

For the remainder of the early 1980s he would have some minor successes as a professional golfer. In February 1981, he was the joint winner of the Victorian Open pro-am, tying Curtis Strange and Graham Marsh at 70 (−2). In 1983, in the third round, he recorded a hole-in-one at the Resch's Pilsner Tweed Classic. In November 1983, Vivian had success at the Victorian PGA Championship. He shot an opening round 70 (−2) to place himself in the top-10. He shot a second round 68 (−4) to move into solo second, four behind leader John Lister. He shot an even-par 72 the next day; though he fell to joint third he was only two shots back of leader Lister at this point. He was not near the lead, however, as the tournament concluded. The following year Vivian had success at the 1984 New South Wales Open. He recorded a hole-in-one on the par-3 9th hole. Unfortunately, it was a day too early for a free car promised by the sponsor. However, after the front nine on Sunday no other golfers in the tournament had recorded a hole-in-one on the hole. Mitsubishi, the sponsor, then decided give a car to Vivian. It was the first car he received after a number of aces in professional tournaments. In 1984 he also won the Tahiti Open.

Within a few years Vivian stopped playing as a touring professional. In 1988 he began work as club pro at a golf club in the Bay of Islands of New Zealand. He worked there for 12 years.

Senior career 
In May 2000 Vivian turned 50. He quickly began playing on the international senior circuits. In 2000, he won seven events on the Australian Legends Tour, including the Australian Seniors PGA Championship and New Zealand PGA Championship. Late in the year he successfully qualified for the European Senior Tour, finishing in second place senior q-school in Spain. In May 2001 he started playing in Europe. It was the first time he played pro golf in Europe since the mid-1970s. He had an immediate success in Europe, recording third place finishes in two of his first three events. Shortly thereafter, in his fifth event, he had a chance to win. He was one back entering the final round of the Jersey Seniors Masters. Against "testing breezes," however, he shot a third round 74 (+2), finishing one out of a playoff. Overall in 2001, Vivian recorded seven top-10s in 15 events.

In 2002, he played 13 events, recording a seven top-10s, including a runner-up finish at the Tobago Plantations Seniors Classic. The following season, despite serious back pain, he was able to record three top-10s among 10 events. This included a runner-up finish at the Scottish Senior Open. In 2004, he played in six events but did not record any top-10s. In late 2004 he seriously competed at the Australian Seniors PGA Championship again. He finished in solo third at 295 (+7), four out of a playoff. In 2005 he did not return to Europe. Back problems ultimately forced him to quit his career as a touring professional.

After he retired from the golf industry Vivian worked in property development. As of 2013, at the age of 63, he still played golf recreationally.

Personal life 
As of 2013, he lived in Kinloch, New Zealand.

Professional wins (9)

PGA Tour of Australasia wins (1)

Other regular wins (6)
1976 Western Samoan Open
1976 Fiji Open
1977 Pacific Harbour Open
1978 Pacific Harbour Open
1980 Pacific Harbour Open
1984 Tahiti Open

Senior wins (2)
2000 New Zealand Senior PGA Championship, Australian PGA Seniors Championship

Team appearances 
World Cup (representing New Zealand): 1976, 1979, 1980

References

External links 

New Zealand male golfers
PGA Tour of Australasia golfers
European Senior Tour golfers
Sportspeople from Hastings, New Zealand
1950 births
Living people